Alfonso Darío Pereira D'Atri (born 25 February 1996) is a Uruguayan professional footballer who plays as a midfielder for Montevideo City Torque.

Career
Pereira is a youth academy product of Rentistas. He made his professional debut on 2 September 2015, coming on as an 89th-minute substitute for David Terans in a 3–0 win against Juventud. He scored his first goal on 1 October 2016 in a 3–0 win against Progreso.

Pereira joined Montevideo Torque during 2017 Uruguayan Segunda División season. He scored five goals from 29 matches during Torque's first ever Primera División season in 2018. He also scored a brace in his side's 3–2 defeat against Nacional in Torneo Intermedio final. Following the relegation of Torque from Primera División, Pereira joined Mexican side Tampico Madero on loan for Clausura of 2018–19 Ascenso MX season.

Career statistics

References

External links
 

1996 births
Living people
Footballers from Montevideo
Association football midfielders
Uruguayan footballers
Uruguayan Primera División players
Uruguayan Segunda División players
Ascenso MX players
C.A. Rentistas players
C.A. Progreso players
Montevideo City Torque players
Tampico Madero F.C. footballers
Uruguayan expatriate footballers
Uruguayan expatriate sportspeople in Mexico
Expatriate footballers in Mexico